In condensed matter physics, an Arrott plot is a plot of the square of the magnetization  of a substance, against the ratio of the applied magnetic field to magnetization  at one (or several) fixed temperature(s). Arrott plots are an easy way of determining the presence of ferromagnetic order in a material. They are named after American physicist Anthony Arrott who introduced them as a technique for studying magnetism in 1957.

Details
According to the Landau theory applied to the mean field picture for magnetism, the free energy of a ferromagnetic material close to a phase transition can be written as:

Close to the phase transition, this gives a relation for the magnetization order parameter:

where  is a dimensionless measure of the temperature.

Thus in a graph plotting  vs.  for various temperatures, the line without an intercept corresponds to the dependence at the critical temperature. Thus along with providing evidence for the existence of a ferromagnetic phase, the Arrott plot can also be used to determine the critical temperature for the phase transition.

Generalization
Giving the critical exponents explicitly in the equation of state, Arrott and Noakes proposed:

Where  are free parameters. In these modified Arrott plots, data is plotted as  versus .

The use of the correct critical exponents for a given system can help give straight lines on the Arott plot, but not in cases such as low magnetic field and amorphous materials. While mean field theory is a more reasonable model for ferromagnets at higher magnetic fields, the presence of more than one magnetic domain in real magnets means that especially at low magnetic fields, the experimentally measured macroscopic magnetic field (which is an average over the whole sample) will not be a reasonable way to determine the local magnetic field (which is felt by a single atom). Therefore, magnetization data taken at low magnetic fields should be ignored for the purposes of Arrott plots.

Transition order
Magnetic phase transitions can be either first order or second order. The nature of the transition can be inferred from the Arrott plot based on the slope of the magnetic isotherms. If the lines are all positive slope, the phase transition is second order, whereas if there are negative slope lines, the phase transition is first order. This condition is known as the Banerjee criterion.

The Banerjee criterion is not always accurate for evaluating inhomogeneous ferromagnets, since the slopes can all be positive even when the transition is first-order.

See also
Curie–Weiss law

References

Electric and magnetic fields in matter
Magnetic ordering